Aman is an Indian anti-war movie directed by Mohan Kumar. It starred Rajendra Kumar, Saira Banu, Balraj Sahani and Chetan Anand in lead roles. The movie was also the debut for Naseeruddin Shah who played an uncredited minor role.

The movie also features a rare cameo by famous British Nobel laureate Bertrand Russell. The movie was shot in England and Japan.

Plot

Meloda (Saira Banu) who was educated in India, speaks Hindi; though she is Japanese. Dr. Gautamdas (Rajendra Kumar) is a UK trained doctor who volunteers to go to Japan to help deal with the horror of the radiation aftermath of Hiroshima and Nagasaki. They meet in Japan and the inevitable happens when hero meets heroine. Lord Bertrand Russell in London, gives Gautam his blessings and best wishes for his travel to Japan. Russell, a pacifist and anti-war thinker (who appears in a cameo role) sets the tone of this 1967 film. On arrival in Japan Dr Gautamdas takes up a role in a hospital where Meloda's father Dr Akhira (Chetan Anand) is director. The storyline takes us through the stark and sometimes gory suffering that radiation victims endured; as a stark reminder of the long term damage caused by atomic weapons. When a group of fishermen are exposed to radiation from French nuclear tests in the Pacific, Dr Gautamdas mounts a daring rescue to help save the fishermen. Battling angry elements Dr. Gautamdas helps the fishermen survive, saving every last one of them - but at what cost? When viewed in the context of India-Japan relationship, beginning with the arrival of Buddhism in Japan, formation of the Indo-Japan Society in 1905 and Japan's support for Subhash Chandra Bose's INA, this film takes on a meaning beyond a love story. It is a cry against the horrors of atomic weapons, the enduring damage they inflict and martyrdom for a cause.

Cast 

 Rajendra Kumar as Dr. Gautamdas 
 Saira Banu as Meloda 
 Om Prakash as Hurato 
 Balraj Sahni as Gautamdas' father 
 Jagjit Singh (Cameo)
 Bertrand Russell (Cameo)
 Chetan Anand as Dr. Akhira, Meloda's father
 Naseeruddin Shah as extra in a crowd

Soundtrack 
The music was composed by Shankar Jaikishan.

References 

1967 films
Indian war drama films
1960s Hindi-language films
Films directed by Mohan Kumar